Valentin Favre (born 14 September 1987) from Châtel, Haute-Savoie, is a French ski mountaineer.

Selected results 
 2011:
 5th, World Championship, team, together with Alexandre Pellicier
 2012:
 2nd, European Championship relay, together with Alexis Sévennec-Verdier, Yannick Buffet and William Bon Mardion
 9th, European Championship, sprint
 1st, Patrouille de la Maya, together with Alexis Sévennec-Verdier and Kílian Jornet Burgada

Pierra Menta 

 2011: 6th, together with Yannick Ecoeur
 2012: 4th, together with Alexis Sevennec-Verdier

External links 
 Valentin Favre at skimountaineering.org
 Official website

References 

1987 births
Living people
French male ski mountaineers
20th-century French people
21st-century French people